Nassim Mekidèche (born April 3, 2000) is an Algerian footballer who plays for Sporting Kansas City II in MLS Next Pro.

Early life
Born in Algeria, Mekidèche grew up in Montreal, Canada, where he played youth soccer with CS Étoiles de L'Est. He represented Quebec at the 2017 Canada Summer Games.

Club career
In May 2018, Mekidèche signed a three-year contract with Algerian club JS Kabylie, initially joining the youth side, with the plan to train regularly with the first team. On November 23, 2018, he made his professional debut, coming on at halftime in a league match against CA Bordj Bou Arreridj. After making minimal appearances for JSK, the club was still interested in extending his contract, which he did signing for an additional two years in August 2020. In February 2021, he underwent surgery on his meniscus, leaving him out for the remainder of the season.

In September 2021, he joined Tunisian club CS Hammam-Lif in the Tunisian Ligue Professionnelle 1. After only making four appearances, he departed the club.

In July 2022, he joined Valour FC of the Canadian Premier League, despite interest from Algerian clubs CR Belouizdad and ES Sétif. He made ten appearances with the club, before departing at the end of the season.

After the expiry of his contract with Valour, he was invited to trial with Major League Soccer club Sporting Kansas City during their 2023 pre-season. In January 2023, he signed a contract with the second team, Sporting Kansas City II, in MLS Next Pro.

References

External links
 

2000 births
Living people
Canadian soccer players
Algerian footballers
People from Algiers
Footballers from Algiers
Association football defenders
Algerian emigrants to Canada
Algerian Ligue Professionnelle 1 players
Tunisian Ligue Professionnelle 1 players
Canadian Premier League players
JS Kabylie players
CS Hammam-Lif players
Valour FC players
Sporting Kansas City II players